Payam Akhavan (Persian: پیام اخوان) is an Iranian-born lawyer. He is a Member of the Permanent Court of Arbitration at The Hague. He is a senior fellow at Massey College at the University of Toronto and is a visiting adjunct at the school's Faculty of Law. He is also a senior fellow at the Raoul Wallenberg Centre for Human Rights.

He was previously Legal Advisor to the Office of the Prosecutor of the International Criminal Tribunal for the former Yugoslavia at the Hague and special advisor to the International Criminal Tribunal for Rwanda. He has served as legal counsel in cases before the International Court of Justice, the International Criminal Court, the European Court of Human Rights, and the Supreme Courts of Canada and the United States.

Early life and career
Akhavan was born in Iran to a Bahá’í family of Jewish origin. His family later emigrated to Toronto, Canada during his childhood, due to the persecution of the persecution of Baháʼís before the Iranian revolution. He has worked in international criminal law and global justice.

International courts and tribunals 
He also served as counsel before the Eritrea-Ethiopia Claims Commission. He was counsel before the International Court of Justice (ICJ) in the Case Concerning Application of the Convention on the Elimination of All Forms of Racial Discrimination (Georgia v Russia) concerning allegations of "ethnic cleansing" in South Ossetia during the August 2008 armed conflict between Georgia and Russia. Additionally he is also counsel to Libya before the ICC in the case concerning Saif Al-Islam Gaddafi and Abdullah Al-Senussi whether the ICC or Libyan courts will prosecute allegations of crimes against humanity arising from the 2011 revolution against Muammar Gaddafi.

In 2013 he acted as counsel for Japan in the Whaling in the Antarctic Case brought by Australia before the ICJ alleging that Japan's program of scientific research was commercial whaling in disguise. In 2008, he was counsel to Sheikh Hasina while she was imprisoned to avoid her participation in national elections. He campaigned for her release. In 2016, the Kurdistan Regional Government asked him to help establish a truth commission to investigate and document ISIS crimes against Yazidis in northern Iraq. He is among the counsel for The Gambia in the Rohingya genocide case filed in 2019 against Myanmar before the ICJ.

Iran human rights advocacy 
Payam Akhavan co-founded the Iran Human Rights Documentation Centre to establish a record of the Islamic Republic's human rights abuses and promote individual accountability for crimes. He served as steering committee member and prosecutor of the Iran People's Tribunal, a victim-based truth commission and informal court in exile, to expose the mass-executions of political prisoners in Iran during the 1980s. This includes Ayatollah Khomeini's fatwa for the mass-execution of some 5,000 people in the summer of 1988. Akhavan appeared in the documentary The Green Wave and has testified before the European Parliament, United States Commissions, and the Canadian Parliament, advocating non-violent democratic transitions, emphasis on human rights rather than the nuclear issue, targeted sanctions against human rights abusers, and firmly opposing war.

He has collaborated Shirin Ebadi on Iran human rights issues, including an opinion piece in the Washington Post. He was the academic supervisor of Nargess Tavassolian, Shirin Ebadi's daughter, during her graduate studies at McGill University. In August 2008, the Iranian Government press made the "accusation" that "Nargess Tavassolian converted to Baháʼísm in 2007 under the direction of Payam Akhavan and started her activities in the Association for Baháʼí Studies" amidst death threats against Ebadi for "serving the foreigners and the Baháʼís."

References

External links 
 Payam Akhavan at Human Rights Day Seminar, Leiden University, The Netherlands, 2013 (Video)

Lawyers from New Haven, Connecticut
Iranian emigrants to Canada
Living people
International law scholars
Academic staff of McGill University
Fernand Braudel Fellows
Harvard Law School alumni
Osgoode Hall Law School alumni
Year of birth missing (living people)
20th-century Canadian lawyers